Bjørnøya, is a common name for Norwegian islands:

 Bear Island (Norway) in the Svalbard archipelago (known as Bjørnøya in Norwegian)
 Bjørnøya, Aremark, in the municipality of Aremark
 Bjørnøya, Aurskog-Høland, in the municipality of Aurskog-Høland
 Bjørnøya, Bamble, in the municipality of Bamble
 Bjørnøya, Bodø, in the municipality of Bodø
 Bjørnøya, Bømlo, in the municipality of Bømlo
 Bjørnøya, Bremanger, in the municipality of Bremanger
 Bjørnøya, Eidskog, in the municipality of Eidskog
 Bjørnøya, Fræna, in the municipality of Fræna
 Bjørnøya, Ålesund, in the municipality of Haram
 Bjørnøya, Hitra, in the municipality of Hitra
 Bjørnøya, Kvænangen, in the municipality of Kvænangen
 Bjørnøya, Larvik, in lake Farris in the municipality of Larvik
 Bjørnøya, Lurøy, in the municipality of Lurøy
 Bjørnøya, Måsøy, in the municipality of Måsøy
 Bjørnøya, Midsund, in the municipality of Midsund
 Bjørnøya, Rennebu, in the municipality of Rennebu
 Bjørnøya, Rødøy, in the municipality of Rødøy
 Bjørnøya, Rømskog, in the municipality of Rømskog
 Bjørnøya, Rygge, in the municipality of Rygge
 Bjørnøya, Snillfjord, in the municipality of Snillfjord
 Bjørnøya, Stjørdal, in the municipality of Stjørdal
 Bjørnøya, Sveio, in the municipality of Sveio
 Bjørnøya, Tromsø, in the municipality of Tromsø
 Bjørnøya, Vestvågøy, in the municipality of Vestvågøy

Related names
 Bjørnøy, Stavanger
 Bjørnøyan, Nesset
 Bjørnøyane, Flekkefjord
 Bjørnøyane, Askvoll
 Bjørnøyaunet, Snillfjord